Yaava Janmada Maitri is a 1972 Kannada language romantic drama film directed by Geethapriya and starring Gangadhar and Kalpana in the lead roles. The film is a direct screen adaptation of the novel "Jeevana Chaduranga" written by the novelist Ma. Bhi. She. Actress Vaishali Kasaravalli made her debut in this film, opposite comedian Narasimharaju. The film was remade in Telugu in 1973 as Sarada, in Tamil in 1973 as Radha and in Hindi in 1975 as Dulhan.

Besides direction, Geethapriya also wrote the lyrics as well as the screenplay and dialogues and won Karnataka State Film Award for the year 1972 for this story. The soundtrack and original score composed by Vijaya Bhaskar was widely acclaimed and won the State Award for music. Actress Kalpana got her maiden Filmfare Best Actress award for her complex portrayal of the lead character.

Cast
Kalpana as Lalitha
Gangadhar as Krishna Murthy
 K. S. Ashwath as Shankar, Lalitha's brother
 Narasimharaju
 Vaishali Kasaravalli
 B. V. Radha
 Rathna
 Dr. Sampath Kumar

Crew
 Producer: M V Venkatachalam
 Production Company: Sudarshan Films (P) Limited
 Director: Geethapriya
 Music: Vijaya Bhaskar
 Lyrics: Geethapriya
 Story: Ma Bhi She
 Screenplay: Geethapriya
 Dialogues: Geethapriya
 Editing: Bal G Yadav, N M Victor
 Cinematography: V Manohar
 Art Direction: Perumal Raju

Soundtrack
The songs composed by Vijaya Bhaskar and sung by P. Susheela, S. Janaki and L. R. Anjali found wide reach and considered one of the best soundtracks winning him a State Award.

Awards

 Karnataka State Film Awards
 Second Best Film
 Best Music Director - Vijaya Bhaskar

 Filmfare Awards South
 Best Actress - Kalpana

References

External links
 

1972 films
Indian romantic drama films
Indian black-and-white films
Films based on Indian novels
Films scored by Vijaya Bhaskar
1972 romantic drama films
1970s Kannada-language films
Kannada films remade in other languages
Films directed by Geethapriya